Alfred Nash Beadleston, Jr. (February 20, 1912 – January 18, 2000) was an American Republican Party politician who served as Speaker of the New Jersey General Assembly and President of the New Jersey Senate.

Biography

Beadleston was born in Rumson, New Jersey, in 1912 to Alfred Nash Beadleston, Sr. (1848–1915), partner in the Beadleston & Woerz brewery, and his wife Helen F. Hazard (1888–1937), daughter of Edward Clarke Hazard of the grocery firm E. C. Hazard and Company. His parents made headlines when they married in 1909, when the elder Beadleston was 60 years old and his bride was only 21. This was his father's second marriage.

Beadleston attended Fay School in Southborough, Massachusetts, and St. Paul's School in Concord, New Hampshire, and Yale College.  After graduating in 1934, Beadleston converted the family brewing company's facilities into commercial property and embarked on a career in public service. In 1938 he was elected to the Shrewsbury Borough Council, and two years later he was elected as Mayor of Shrewsbury, New Jersey. He served as Shrewsbury mayor from 1941 to 1952.

In 1951 Beadleston was elected to the General Assembly from Monmouth County. In 1954 he authored legislation commonly known as "The Beadleston Act," which protected students in the State of New Jersey with educational disabilities by guaranteeing their right to special education. The Beadleston Act is highly regarded as the cornerstone predecessor to the Education for All Handicapped Children Act, and subsequently the Individuals with Disabilities Education Act.

Beadleston was named Speaker of the Assembly in 1964. In 1967 he was elected to the State Senate. He served as Senate President in 1973, becoming one of the few politicians in state history to hold the leadership posts in both houses of the legislature.

Beadleston declined to run for another Senate term in 1977, retiring to his Rumson home. He died on January 18, 2000, at Riverview Medical Center in Red Bank at the age of 88.

Family
Beadleston's first marriage, to Sylvia Lawrence White on February 16, 1935. They had William Beadleston, their son, in 1936. Their marriage ended in divorce. He married Isabel Palmer Morrell Waud on February 7, 1948. She was the widow of Dr. Sydney P. Waud of Chicago, a colonel in the Army Medical Corps.

References

External links
 Beadleston Act
 Alfred N. Beadleston at The Political Graveyard
 Alfred N. Beadleston at The New York Times
 Isabel M. Beadleston at The New York Times

1912 births
2000 deaths
People from Rumson, New Jersey
People from Shrewsbury, New Jersey
Yale College alumni
Mayors of places in New Jersey
Speakers of the New Jersey General Assembly
Republican Party members of the New Jersey General Assembly
Republican Party New Jersey state senators
Presidents of the New Jersey Senate
20th-century American politicians
Fay School alumni
St. Paul's School (New Hampshire) alumni